Robert T. Johnson (born September 5, 1945 in Kansas City, Missouri) is Republican politician from Lee's Summit, Missouri.  In 1972, he was elected to the Missouri House of Representatives and later served in the state senate. He currently serves on the Lee's Summit City Council for the 4th district.

References 
 Kirkpatrick, James C. "Official Manual State of Missouri, 1975–1976"

External links 
 City of Lee's Summit, Missouri: Mayor and City Council, retrieved on July 30, 2008

1945 births
Living people
Republican Party members of the Missouri House of Representatives
Missouri city council members